Grand Rabbi Shraga Feivish Hager, also known as the Kosover Rebbe, is the rebbe of the Kosov Hasidic dynasty, a dayan ("rabbinic judge"), and noted orator. He is known as a creative and insightful thinker, whose original teachings are nevertheless rooted in Hasidic mystical tradition. He is also a powerful prayer-leader, and has attracted a large following among younger Hasidim.

Rabbinic career
Hager is the dayan of the Vizhnitz community in Borough Park as well as posek for Chesed shel Emes.

Hager is well known for his role regarding contemporary Halacha and is not afraid to be actively involved on taboo issues among Haredim, and more specifically, on controversies where the old traditional Jewish lifestyle clashes with the modern world. He is on the board of the internet filtering service provider J net and has been involved in a controversy concerning Kapparos.

Personal life
Rabbi Hager is an alumnus of the Chachmei Lublin, Ponevezh, and Lakewood yeshivos. He currently resides in Borough Park, Brooklyn, New York.

Family
Rabbi Hager is the successor and eldest son of Holocaust-survivor Rabbi Avrohom Yehoshua Heshel Hager, Kosover-Zalishchiker Rebbe of Borough Park (Died 1999), who was the son of Rabbi Shraga Feivish Hager (1870–1937), Zalishchiker Rebbe; son of Rabbi Boruch Hager (1845–1892) of Vizhnitz. The Zalishchiker Rebbe was a son-in-law of Rabbi Moshe Hager (1860–1925), Kosover Rebbe and author of Leket Oni.
 
Rabbi Hager is a son-in-law of Rabbi Chaim Wosner, Rav of Zichron Meir in Bnei Brak (son of Rabbi Shmuel Wosner, preeminent posek).

Rabbi Hager's younger brother was crowned as Zalishchiker Rebbe.
The brothers jointly republished the Leket Oni in 1996.

References

External links
Kosover Rebbe: Do Not Go To Palm Readers, or Fortunetellers (Yeshiva World News)
9th Grade of Wiznitz school of Williamsburg in the study of the Kosover Rebbe 
Sefer Leket Oni (Google Books)

American Hasidic rabbis
Hasidic rebbes
Jews and Judaism in Brooklyn
Living people
Vizhnitz (Hasidic dynasty)
Rabbis from New York (state)
People from Borough Park, Brooklyn
Year of birth missing (living people)